"Man of a Thousand Faces" is the lead single from British neo-progressive rock band Marillion's ninth studio album This Strange Engine, released on 2 June 1997 by Castle Communications imprint Raw Power. It was the band's first single since they departed from EMI Records in 1995. Reflecting the decline in popularity for Marillion, the song reached only the number 98 on the UK Singles Chart. A music video was created for "Man of a Thousand Faces".

Track listing

Personnel

Marillion
 Steve Hogarth – vocals
 Steve Rothery – guitar
 Pete Trewavas – bass
 Mark Kelly – keyboards
 Ian Mosley – drums, percussion

Additional musicians
 Charlton & Newbottle School Choir – choir

Technical personnel
 Stewart Every – engineer
 Dave Meegan – mixing engineer
 Andrew Gent – artwork
 Hugh Gilmour – art direction, design

Charts

References

Marillion songs
1997 songs
1997 singles
Songs written by Steve Hogarth